Fulk Basset (died 1259) was a medieval Bishop of London.

He was a younger son of Alan Basset, of High Wycombe in Buckinghamshire. He became Dean of York in 1239, then was elected as Bishop of London in 1241, probably in December. His election was confirmed by the archbishop on 23 January 1244 and he was consecrated on 9 October of that year.

On the death of his brother Gilbert in 1241, he inherited estates including the manors of Berwick and Marden, both in Wiltshire.

He died on 21 May 1259. His death was commemorated on that day and he was buried on 25 May.

His nephew, Richard Talbot, was elected Bishop of London in 1262, but died before he could be consecrated.

Citations

References
 
 

Bishops of London
Deans of York
1259 deaths
13th-century English Roman Catholic bishops
Year of birth unknown
Feudal barons of Wycombe